The Guidotti–Greenspan rule is an international economics guideline that states that a country's reserves should equal short-term external debt (one-year or less maturity), implying a ratio of reserves-to-short term debt of 1. The rationale is that countries should have enough reserves to resist a massive withdrawal of short term foreign capital.

The rule is named after Pablo Guidotti – Argentine former deputy minister of finance – and Alan Greenspan – former chairman of the Federal Reserve Board of the United States. Guidotti first stated the rule in a G-33 seminar in 1999, while Greenspan widely publicized it in a speech at the World Bank. In subsequent research Guzman Calafell and Padilla del Bosque found that the ratio of reserves to external debt is a relevant predictor of an external crisis.

References

External links
 http://www.marketoracle.co.uk/Article15449.html

International finance
Finance theories